The TS/S Stefan Batory was an ocean liner built in the Netherlands in 1952. It was operated by Holland America Lines and later Polish Ocean Lines. It remained in service until 1988 and was scrapped in 2000 in Turkey.

History
The ocean liner was put into service, as the fourth Holland America Line (HA) liner to serve under the name of SS Maasdam. It was initially used to service the Dutch East Indies by the Holland America Line. The ship was originally planned as an ordinary freighter under the name of "Diemerdyk" and plans changed during construction to become a passenger liner.

The liner later began trans-Atlantic service between West Germany and New York. On 15 February 1963, in the Weser estuary off West Germany, the liner struck the wreck of the British ship Harborough, which had sunk in 1959 after striking the wreck of the Soviet ship Kholmogry. The Maasdam, carrying 500 persons, was safely evacuated despite a bad list, then was safely sailed to Bremerhaven by a skeleton crew.

The ship was bought by the Polish government in June 1968 and began service as a Polish ocean liner on 11 April 1969 as a replacement for the then obsolete MS Batory. The ship was rechristened the TSS Stefan Batory, named after a king of Poland Stefan Batory (1533–1586).

After she was refitted and renamed at Gdansk, she became the flagship of the Polish Ocean Lines (1969–1988) and mainly sailed from Gdynia–Copenhagen–Rotterdam–London–Montreal–Southampton–Rotterdam–Copenhagen–Gdynia. According to the contemporary press, on her first arrival in Rotterdam as the Stefan Batory in 1969, the former owners of her expressed their interest in buying her back from Polish owners for service under the former flag.

TSS Batory remained in regular service until 1988. During that time, trans-Atlantic travel changed to use passenger airplanes and saw the end of the era of trans-Atlantic liners. By 1988, the Batory was one of the only trans-Atlantic passenger liners sailing regularly-scheduled voyages between Europe and North America. The ship was used briefly for ocean cruises until 1990, when it was sold to the Swedish government, renamed as the Stefan and used to house asylum seekers in Gothenburg from 1990–1992. Unused from 1992, the Batory was finally scrapped in Aliağa, Turkey, commencing in May 2000.

Onboard travel
What gave a unique atmosphere during Polish transatlantic cruises were the orchestras. The orchestras, for many years associated with Batory, were directed by Czesław Słabolepszy, Paweł Laskowski, Janusz Popławski and Bronisław Dyszkiewicz. From 1969, passengers were entertained by two orchestras – an octet playing mid-morning symphonic concerts and evening balls in a large ballroom and a quartet, which played to guests in the afternoon (English tea time). The smaller band played during dinner and evening dance in a small salon (from 9.00 pm till 2.00 am). There were two notable orchestras on the Stefan Batory: guitarist Jerzy Kowalewski' band and a well-known group from Katowice under the direction of saxophonist/clarinettist Bronisław Dyszkiewicz. Another prominent musician playing on MS Batory, and later TSS Stefan Batory, was Alojzy Musiał, a star of Polish jazz music in the 1950s and 1960s.

During her long service, the Stefan Batory has at least twice appeared in film, significantly remembered, as "part of the set" in Kochaj albo rzuć (Love or Leave). The motion picture team simply filmed the ship, festively leaving Gdynia, and a part of her original, regular voyage.

In 1962, Lee Harvey Oswald, his wife Marina and their daughter were brought to the United States from the Soviet Union on board the SS Maasdam.

Technical data
10 decks
Tonnage — 15,024 BRT
Length — 153.4 m (503 ft).
Width — 21.0 m (69 ft).
Height — 21.0 m (69 ft).
Speed — 17 knots
Passengers — 39 1st class; 734 tourist class.
Crew — 336.
Engines — steam turbines.
Stabilizers to reduce heeling

References

 ts/s Stefan Batory. (1971). Polish Ocean Lines, Gdynia, Poland.
 Website dedicated to the TSS STEFAN BATORY

Ocean liners
Cruise ships
Passenger ships of Poland
1952 ships
Ships built by Wilton-Fijenoord
Maritime incidents in 1963